Michal Navrátil may refer to:

 Michal Navrátil (born 1985), Czech diver
 Michal Navrátil (tennis) (born 1982), Czech tennis player